Gerry Colgan (20 June 1951 – 5 February 2011) was a Scottish amateur football left back and left winger who made over 140 appearances in the Scottish League for Queen's Park. He also played for Clydebank, Hamilton Academical and East Stirlingshire.

Personal life 
Colgan attended Strathclyde University and began teaching chemistry at St Patrick's High School in Coatbridge in 1973. He moved to St Andrew's High School in East Kilbride in 1978 and progressed to become the senior deputy head teacher. He later moved to the same role at the merged St Andrew's and St Bride's High School in the town. In February 2011, Colgan collapsed with a heart attack at Cathkin Braes Golf Club and was pronounced dead on arrival at Southern General Hospital in Glasgow.

References

Scottish footballers
Scottish Football League players
Queen's Park F.C. players
Association football defenders
Footballers from Coatbridge
1951 births
2011 deaths
Association football wingers
Clydebank F.C. (1965) players
Hamilton Academical F.C. players
East Stirlingshire F.C. players
Scottish schoolteachers
Alumni of the University of Strathclyde
Scotland amateur international footballers